Datuk Lamri Ali is a former Director of Sabah Parks.  At the December 1999 World Conservation Union (IUCN)'s regional meeting staged in Pakse, Laos, Ali was awarded the WCPA-IUCN Fred M. Packard Award. The award recognises his contribution to nature conservation and protected area movement in Malaysia. Datuk Lamri is the only Malaysian recipient of this award.

Nepenthes × alisaputrana, a hybrid of two well-known Bornean pitcher plant species, is named in his honour.

References

Living people
Malaysian environmentalists
Year of birth missing (living people)